Jharkatahan is a beautiful village of Thana Reoti in Ballia district in the Indian state of Uttar Pradesh. It is situated near bank of Ghaghara river. It comprises a Taal; a catchment area of Ghaghara river. TS band ( Tutipar-Srinagar) passes through this village and it is a vital security entity that protects villagers from the flood of Ghaghara river.

Temples

 Kali Temple (Sarkari Sachool Ke Paas)
 Durga Mata Temple  (Uttar Tola)
 Hanuman Temple (Bichala Tola)
 Budhwa Shiv Temple (East & South corner of Village)
 Jharkeshwar Baba (Shiv Temple)
 Hanuman Mandir (Dakshin Tola)

Education

 R.N.S. Public School (North side in Village).
 Govt. School

External links
 Jharkatahan on Facebook
 Jharkatahan on Wikimapia

Villages in Ballia district